Frank Adiele Eke (27 June 1931 – 4 January 2013), was a Nigerian medical doctor and politician. He was the first Deputy Governor of Rivers State, serving from 1979 to 1983 under Governor Melford Okilo and the first Ikwerre man to study at the Harvard University USA, where he earned a Master of Public Health in 1972. He was from Woji. 

He died on 4 January 2013 after a short illness. Prior to his death, he was the paramount ruler of Evo Kingdom in Obio-Akpor local government area. His full title was HRM. King Dr. (Amb) Sir Frank Adiele Eke (Eze Gbakagbaka of Evo land).

Family 
He was married to Evang. Beatrice Chiebonam Eke and had 6 children with her as follows: Leslie Eke, Graham Eke, Ada Eke, Ngozi Oyewole, Onyinye Unachukwu and Frank Eke.

See also
List of people from Rivers State

References

1931 births
2013 deaths
Deputy Governors of Rivers State
Medical doctors from Rivers State
Ikwerre people
People from Obio-Akpor
Harvard School of Public Health alumni